Sabotsy Anjiro is a rural municipality that is composed by two towns (Sabotsy & Anjiro)  in Madagascar. It belongs to the district of Moramanga, which is a part of Alaotra-Mangoro Region. The population of the commune was estimated to be 17,418 in 2018 and lies approximately 80 km west of Antananarivo, along the National Road 2 to Toamasina.

Primary and junior level secondary education are available in town. The majority 80% of the population of the commune are farmers.  The most important crop is rice, while other important products are beans and cassava.  Services provide employment for 20% of the population.

Both towns, Sabotsy and Anjiro have a train station along the Antananarivo East coast line. They lie at the Mangoro River.

Roads
The municipality of Sabotsy Anjiro is crossed by the National Road 2.

References

Populated places in Alaotra-Mangoro